Espagne may refer to:
French for Spain.
A number of steamships were named Espagne, including - 
Cinsaut, a wine grape